Amy McCann (born 26 October 1983 in Walsall) is an English–born Northern Irish footballer, who has represented clubs including Wolverhampton Wanderers Women, Everton and Birmingham City Ladies as a striker. McCann has played for Northern Ireland at senior international level.

Club career
McCann's 21 goals for Wolves won the golden boot in 2004–05, as the club finished runners–up to Sunderland Women in the FA Women's Premier League Northern Division.

After a season with Everton, McCann signed for Birmingham City in 2006. During 2009–10 she returned to Wolves on dual–signing terms, to regain fitness after the birth of her child.

International career
McCann was called up to a Northern Ireland training camp in November 2007, after Birmingham City's programme editor alerted them to her eligibility. McCann's grandfather Henry was from Portadown.

She made her international debut on 16 February 2008, as a 77th-minute substitute in a 4–0 defeat in Spain.

Personal life
McCann is a season ticket holder at Walsall F.C.

References

English women's footballers
Everton F.C. (women) players
Birmingham City W.F.C. players
Northern Ireland women's international footballers
FA Women's National League players
1983 births
Living people
English people of Northern Ireland descent
Women's association footballers from Northern Ireland
Sportspeople from Walsall
Leicester City W.F.C. players
Women's association football forwards
Wolverhampton Wanderers W.F.C. players